Omar Khayyam (1914–1938) was a British-born Thoroughbred racehorse who was sold as a yearling to an American racing partnership and who became the first foreign-bred horse to win the Kentucky Derby. He was named for the famous Persian mathematician, poet, and astronomer, Omar Khayyam.

Bloodlines
Omar Khayyam was out of the mare Lisma, daughter of the champion sire Persimmon; his success on the track included wins in The Derby, St. Leger Stakes and Ascot Gold Cup. He was sired by Marco, a leading three-year-old in England in 1895 and great-grandson of the first English Triple Crown Champion, West Australian.

Racing career
Trained by Charles Patterson, Omar Khayyam was sent to the track in 1916 as a two-year-old. His most important result that year was a second to Campfire in the Hopeful Stakes. In his three-year-old season, no U.S. Triple Crown series had yet been formalized; the Kentucky Derby and Preakness Stakes were held on the same day. Choosing to run in the Derby, Omar Khayyam was fourth in a mile and an eighth prep race at Lexington to Ticket. As a result, he was sent off at 13–1 odds in the Kentucky Derby. Ridden by jockey Charles Borel,  Omar Khayyam unleashed a powerful stretch run to come from tenth place to win over the favorite Ticket.

Three weeks after his Derby win, Omar Khayyam was sold as part of his owner's multi-horse dispersal auction held on the grounds of New York's Belmont Park. He was purchased by Canadian biscuit manufacturer Wilfrid Viau. For his new owner, the colt went on to win the Prospect Handicap at Jamaica Race Course; the Brooklyn Derby at the old Aqueduct Racetrack; and (at the Saratoga Race Course) the Kenner Stakes, the Saratoga Cup and the Travers Stakes. In Maryland Omar Khayyam won the Havre de Grace Handicap and – despite a 30-pound handicap – set a new Pimlico Race Course track record in winning the Pimlico Autumn Handicap.

After the other entrants were scratched, the October 18, 1917, John R. McLean Memorial Championship at Laurel Park Racecourse turned into a match race between Omar Khayyam and August Belmont Jr. Belmont Stakes winner, Hourless. Earlier that year, Omar Khayyam had beaten Hourless in the 1½ mile Lawrence Realization Stakes and in the Brooklyn Derby. This time, however, Hourless won by a length. Despite Omar Khayyam's earlier wins over Hourless and the fact that he had earned $20,000 more than Hourless in purses that year (in more starts with greater consistency), Omar Khayyam shared American Champion Three-Year-Old Male Horse honors with Hourless.

As a four-year-old in 1918, Omar Khayyam's chances of winning were limited due to his high weight assignments; however, he won the Marines' Liberty Bond Handicap. The following year, at five, he won the Rennert Handicap at Pimlico under Clarence Kummer before being retired to stand at Claiborne Farm in Paris, Kentucky for the 1920 season.

Progeny
In 1929, Omar Khayyam was moved to the J. P. Jones stud in Charlottesville, Virginia, where he remained until his death in 1938. Among his offspring was Malicious, an “iron horse” who won 32 races out of 185 career starts. Another son, Mr. Khayyam, won the 1933 Wood Memorial Stakes and the 1934 Metropolitan Handicap. Yet another, Balko, won the 1930 Toboggan and Baltimore Handicaps.

Pedigree

See also
Campfire (horse)
Charles B. Borel
Hourless

References

External links
 Omar Khayyam's pedigree and partial racing stats
 May 13, 1917 New York Times article on Omar Khayyam's victory in the Kentucky Derby
 New York Times article on the 1917 John R. McLean Memorial Championship
 Thoroughbred Heritage profile of Omar Khayyam
 Omar Khayyam's offspring at the Classic Runners database

1914 racehorse births
1938 racehorse deaths
Racehorses bred in the United Kingdom
Racehorses trained in the United States
Horse racing track record setters
American Champion racehorses
Kentucky Derby winners
Thoroughbred family 9-h
Godolphin Arabian sire line